Bummi may refer to:

 Bummi (magazine), an East German children's magazine
 "Bummi-Lied", a German children's song
 a bear character in the East German children's puppet series with the kobold Pittiplatsch
 nickname of Ralf Bursy (1956–2022), German singer and music producer

See also
 Bummy (disambiguation)